Peace Out of Pain is the thirteenth and final episode of the fourth series of the period drama Upstairs, Downstairs. It first aired on 7 December 1974 on ITV.

Background
Peace Out of Pain was recorded in the studio on 19 and 20 September 1974. In this episode, Meg Wynn Owen makes her final appearance as Hazel Bellamy. Peace Out of Pain was watched by 7.20 million people.

Cast
Jean Marsh - Rose
Gordon Jackson - Hudson
Lesley-Anne Down - Georgina Worsley
Simon Williams - James Bellamy
Meg Wynn Owen - Hazel Bellamy
David Langton - Richard Bellamy
Angela Baddeley - Mrs Bridges
Hannah Gordon - Virginia Hamilton
Christopher Beeny - Edward
Jacqueline Tong - Daisy
Jenny Tomasin - Ruby
Anthony Woodruff - Dr Foley

Plot
It is November 1918 and James and Hazel argue, it is implied that James strikes her, and Hazel runs out crying. When Rose comforts her on the stairs, she realises she has a temperature. Dr Foley soon comes round and tells Hazel that she has caught the Spanish flu that is currently a pandemic. She and James make up, but on 9 November 1918 Hazel dies at Eaton Place. Rose is greatly upset by her death. The funeral is held on 11 November, the day the war ends, at St Mark's Church in Wimbledon. Rose, Hudson, Mrs Bridges and Ruby attend while Edward and Daisy stay behind. Daisy wants to start a new life outside of service and wants to give two weeks notice, but Edward is more hesitant. That evening, James insists that Georgina, who had been sent home from France due to exhaustion, go to an Armistice Party, while Edward, Daisy and Ruby also go out and celebrate.

Meanwhile, Virginia Hamilton sends a letter to Richard saying she'll be arriving in London with her two children that evening. Richard rushes to meet her, and at dinner that evening she agrees to marry him, he having asked her via a letter, and they plan to move to Hyde Park after their marriage. Rose discovers that she has been left £1200 following Gregory's death.

Bridge story
This is the last episode of series 4 and is set in November 1918 while the first episode of the fifth series is set in summer 1919. To explain what happens in the meantime, a story written by Alfred Shaughnessy was published in three parts in Woman magazine from 10 February 1975. This story features a storyline where Georgina falls out with her friends Angela Barclay, Harry and Martin after she discovers she is merely being used by Martin to make Angela jealous. In addition, the story explains Edward and Daisy's exit and Lily's entrance, while Richard goes up to Scotland to meet Virginia's father-in-law. Rose meanwhile briefly goes out with a friend of Gregory's, but soon realises that Gregory was her only true love. The story concludes with the marriage of Richard and Virginia.

Footnotes

References
Richard Marson, "Inside UpDown - The Story of Upstairs, Downstairs", Kaleidoscope Publishing, 2005 
Updown.org.uk - Upstairs, Downstairs Fansite

Upstairs, Downstairs (series 4) episodes
1974 British television episodes
Fiction set in 1918